Altındağ is part of the city of Ankara, Turkey.

Altındağ may also refer to:
Altındağ, İzmir, a zone of Bornova district, İzmir, Turkey
Altındağ (İzmir Metro), a proposed metro station in that zone
Tevfik Altındağ (born 1988), German footballer of Turkish descent

See also

Altyn-Tagh, a mountain range in northwestern China